Hsin Bau (born 1964) is a Taiwanese Buddhist monk and elder of the Fo Guang Shan worldwide Buddhist organization who currently serves as its head abbot and director since 2013.  Hsin Bau ordained as a śrāmaṇera novice under Hsing Yun in 1986. In 1988, he received the full upasampadā vinaya precepts at Hsi Lai Temple, the North American regional headquarters of Fo Guang Shan, in California, during which time he received the dharma name Hui Chi (慧濟). In 2004, he was appointed abbot of Hsi Lai Temple after being stationed in California for several years. Following tradition, he now uses his inner dharma name, Hsin Bau, as abbot and chairman of the Fo Guang Shan board of directors. He was subsequently re-elected to a second term as abbot in 2018.

References 

zh:釋心保

1964 births
Living people
People from Taichung
Taiwanese Buddhist monks
Taiwanese religious leaders
Taiwanese Zen Buddhists
Rinzai Buddhists
Fo Guang Shan Buddhists